The balboa (sign: B/.; ISO 4217: PAB) is, along with the United States dollar, one of the official currencies of Panama. It is named in honor of the Spanish explorer/conquistador Vasco Núñez de Balboa. The balboa is subdivided into 100 centésimos.

History
The balboa replaced the Colombian peso in 1904 following the country's independence. The balboa has been tied to the United States dollar (which is also legal tender in Panama) at an exchange rate of 1:1 since its introduction and has always circulated alongside dollars.

Panama has never had an official central bank. The National Bank of Panama, one of two government-owned banks, was responsible for nonmonetary aspects of central banking in Panama, assisted by the National Banking Commission (Superintendencia del Mercado de Valores), which was created along with the country's International Financial Center, and was charged with licensing and supervising banks.

Coins

Current

Obsolete

These coins were weight-related to the 25 gram 50 centésimos, making the  centésimos coin 1.25 grams. Its small size led to it being known as the "Panama pill" or the "Panama pearl". In 1907, copper-nickel , and  centésimo coins were introduced, followed by copper-nickel 5 centésimo coins in 1929. In 1935, bronze 1 centésimo coins were introduced, with  centésimo pieces minted in 1940.

In 1966, Panama followed the U.S. in changing the composition of their silver coins, with copper-nickel-clad  and  balboa, and .400 fineness  balboa. One-balboa coins, at .900 fineness silver, were issued that year for the first time since 1947. In 1973, copper-nickel-clad  balboa coins were introduced. 1973 also saw the revival of the  centésimos coin, which had a size similar to that of the U.S. half dime, but these were discontinued two years later due to lack of popular demand. In 1983, 1 centésimo coins followed their U.S. counterpart by switching from copper to copper-plated zinc. Further issues of the 1 balboa coins have been made since 1982 in copper-nickel without reducing its size.

Modern 1, 5 centésimo, and  balboa coins are the same weight, dimensions, and composition as the U.S. cent, nickel, dime, quarter, and half dollar, respectively. In 2011, new 1-balboa bimetallic coins were issued that are the same dimensions as the U.S. dollar coin.

In addition to circulating issues, commemorative coins in denominations of 5, 10, 20, 50, 75, 100, 150, 200, and 500 balboas have also been issued. At the time the .925 fineness sterling silver 20 balboa coin honoring Simón Bolívar was introduced in 1971, it was the largest legal tender silver coin in the world, containing 3.85 ozt silver and having a 61 mm diameter.

Banknotes

In 1941, President Arnulfo Arias pushed the government to enact Article 156 to the constitution, authorizing official and private banks to issue paper money. As a result, on 30 September 1941, El Banco Central de Emisión de la República de Panamá (Central Bank of Issue of the Republic of Panama) was established.

Exchange rate

See also
 Economy of Panama

References

Citations

Sources 

 
 

Currencies of Central America
Economy of Panama
Fixed exchange rate
Currencies introduced in 1904
Currency symbols